Travis Cole Chick (born June 10, 1984) is an American former professional baseball pitcher. He played in Major League Baseball (MLB) for the Seattle Mariners.

Career
Chick was drafted by the Florida Marlins in the 14th round of the 2002 Major League Baseball Draft. After two seasons in the low minors, he was traded to the San Diego Padres, who subsequently traded Chick and Justin Germano to the Cincinnati Reds for Joe Randa on July 23, 2005. On July 6, 2006, he was again traded, this time to the Seattle Mariners for pitcher Eddie Guardado and cash considerations.

The Mariners assigned Chick to the Double-A San Antonio Missions. He was called up to the Mariners in September and made his major league debut on September 13, . He appeared in three games for the Mariners and returned to the minors for the next two seasons. He became a free agent at the end of the  season and signed a minor league contract with the Los Angeles Dodgers. He most recently pitched for the Chattanooga Lookouts.   For the 2010 season, Chick signed with the Camden Riversharks of the independent Atlantic League.  The Riversharks placed Chick on the inactive list July 16, 2010. Chick finish his stint with Camden with a 5–4 record and a 4.40 ERA while seeing action as both a starter and reliever.  On July 27, 2010, Chick was signed by the Pittsburgh Pirates and was sent to their Class AAA affiliate, the Indianapolis Indians.   Chick was soon traded to the Texas Rangers on August 13, 2010, for a PTBNL or cash.  Chick retired in 2010.

Wealth management career 
Following his professional baseball career, Chick began his work as a Financial Advisor at Merrill Lynch. In 2018, Chick began working at AWM Capital, a multi-family office serving first-generation wealth creators (athletes, founders, doctors, key employees). In 2019, Chick obtained a Certificate in Financial Planning from Pepperdine Graziadio Business School and successfully passed the Certified Financial Planner certification (CFP).

References

External links

1984 births
Living people
People from Irving, Texas
Baseball players from Texas
Major League Baseball pitchers
Seattle Mariners players
Gulf Coast Marlins players
Greensboro Bats players
Jamestown Jammers players
Fort Wayne Wizards players
Chattanooga Lookouts players
Navegantes del Magallanes players
American expatriate baseball players in Venezuela
Mobile BayBears players
San Antonio Missions players
West Tennessee Diamond Jaxx players
Tacoma Rainiers players
Camden Riversharks players
Indianapolis Indians players
Frisco RoughRiders players